Konidela Ram Charan Teja (born 27 March 1985) is an Indian actor, producer, and entrepreneur who works predominantly in Telugu films. One of the highest-paid actors in Indian cinema, he is the recipient of three Filmfare Awards and two Nandi Awards. Since 2013, he has featured in Forbes Indias Celebrity 100 list.

Charan made his acting debut with Chirutha (2007), a box office hit, winning the Filmfare Award for Best Male Debut – South. He rose to prominence starring in S. S. Rajamouli's fantasy action film Magadheera (2009), the highest-grossing Telugu film of all time at the time, winning the Filmfare Award for Best Actor – Telugu. His notable works include Racha (2012), Naayak (2013), Yevadu (2014), Govindudu Andarivadele (2014), and Dhruva (2016).

In 2016, Charan launched his own production house Konidela Production Company, which has notably backed Khaidi No. 150 (2017) and Sye Raa Narasimha Reddy (2019).

Filmography

As an actor

As a producer

Awards

Notes

References 

Male actor filmographies
Indian filmographies
Lists of awards received by Indian actor